The Brunswick Heritage Museum is a railroad and history museum in Brunswick, Maryland.

History
The Brunswick Potomac Foundation was founded during the town's 75th Anniversary Diamond Jubilee and originally focused on hosting local events including Railroad Days, an annual street festival held during the first full weekend in October. In 1974, the group purchased a building from a fraternal lodge to host a museum.  Founded as the Brunswick Railroad Museum, the museum originally focused exclusively on railroads. In 2013, the name was changed to Brunswick Heritage Museum and the mission of the museum expanded to include the history of Brunswick, a company town of the Baltimore and Ohio Railroad.

Collection
The first floor has a younger children's play and dress up area. The second floor focuses on life in Brunswick during different time periods, and on the C&O Canal. The third floor consists of an HO scale model railroad layout depicting the B&O Railroad's Metropolitan line (the MET) from Washington, DC to Brunswick, Maryland in the late 1950s.

Brunswick Visitor Center
The Brunswick Visitor Center is also on the first floor and is maintained by the National Park Service as a tenant.  This is a unit of the Chesapeake and Ohio Canal National Historical Park.

Building
The museum is housed in the former Improved Order of Red Men fraternal lodge. The three-story brick building or "wigwam" was built in 1904 by the Delaware Tribe No. 43 who occupied the building until 1936. The Fraternal Order of Eagles Brunswick Aerie No. 1136 purchased the building on June 1, 1936 and removed the Native American statue from the entrance. That statue is now on the second floor of the museum. The museum chose the building because it is located less than a block from the Brunswick Line MARC commuter line and four tracks of the CSX mainline.

References

External links
 The Brunswick Heritage Museum

Railroad museums in Maryland
History museums in Maryland
Museums in Frederick County, Maryland
Model railway shows and exhibitions
Improved Order of Red Men
Miniature railroads in the United States